Joel Dean may refer to the following people:

 Joel Dean (economist) (1906–1979), American economist
 Joel Dean (fl. 1970s–2020s), one of the founders of Dean & DeLuca
 Joel Dean (fl. 2000s–2020s), co-writer for songs of Bill Grainer, songwriter and record producer

See also
 Joel Deane (born 1969), Australian writer